The 1994 Edmonton Eskimos season was the 37th season for the team in the Canadian Football League and their 46th overall. The Eskimos finished in 2nd place in the West Division with a 13–5 record. However, they were upset in the 1994 West Semi-Final against the eventual Grey Cup Champion BC Lions.

Offseason

CFL draft

Preseason

Schedule

Regular season

Season standings

Season schedule 

Total attendance: 268806

Average attendance: 29867

Awards and records

1994 CFL All-Stars

Defence 
 DT – Bennie Goods, Edmonton Eskimos
 LB – Willie Pless, Edmonton Eskimos
 DB – Robert Holland, Edmonton Eskimos

Special teams 
 ST – Henry "Gizmo" Williams, Edmonton Eskimos

Western All-Star selections

Offence 
 OT – Blake Dermott, Edmonton Eskimos

Defence 
 DT – Bennie Goods, Edmonton Eskimos
 LB – Willie Pless, Edmonton Eskimos
 DB – Robert Holland, Edmonton Eskimos

Special teams 
 ST – Henry "Gizmo" Williams, Edmonton Eskimos

Playoffs

West Semi-final

References 

Edmonton Elks seasons
1994 in Alberta
1994 Canadian Football League season by team